TRAFFIC (Trade Records Analysis of Flora and Fauna in Commerce), the Wildlife Trade Monitoring Network, is a global non-governmental organisation monitoring the trade in wild animals and plants that focuses on biodiversity and sustainable development. It was originally created in 1976 as a specialist group of the Species Survival Commission of the International Union for Conservation of Nature (IUCN), and evolved into a strategic alliance of the World Wide Fund for Nature (WWF) and the IUCN.

History

1990s 

TRAFFIC established 13 more offices worldwide including in Europe (1990), in East/Southern Africa (1991) and in East Asia (1994). The organisation looked into trade issues including tiger, agarwood, and rhino and established the Bad Ivory Database System (BIDS) which became the foundation for the highly important ETIS. TRAFFIC's first major work in Africa looked into the decline of black rhinos, which assessed the future for rhinos against serious threats from poaching and continued horn trafficking. In the first global attempt to keep track of all the rhino horn in circulation, TRAFFIC established the Rhino Horn and Product Database. It provided a valuable source of information for government and private sources to regulate rhino horn trade, and has been expanded to include data from 54 countries.

TRAFFIC turned its attention to medicinal plants and performed surveys to assess the impact of plant trade in Europe on wild plant populations in 1993. The organisation hosted a symposium on medicinal plants later in the decade, which was attended by more than 120 plant specialists and government and industry representatives.

2000s 

The following decade saw increasing collaboration and multifaceted ways to improve enforcement and tackle wildlife crime. In 2005, TRAFFIC supported the Association of South East Asian Nations (ASEAN) in their creation of Wildlife Enforcement network (ASEAN-WEN).

TRAFFIC branched out into what it now refers to as the "green stream", promoting sustainable wildlife trade rather than tackling unsustainable trade. In 2007, TRAFFIC, the WWF, IUCN, and BfN launched the International Standard for Sustainable Wild Collection of Medicinal and Aromatic Plants (ISSC-MAP) for sustainable wild collection of medicinal and aromatic plants.

2010s 

TRAFFIC began to incorporate more social and economic responsibility into its work, empowering communities whilst promoting sustainable wildlife trade. In 2011 a project was launched working with groups of indigenous women in the Amazon to promote sustainable trade and provide alternative sources of income to the unsustainable harvest of wildmeat. A partnership was set up between TRAFFIC, the Association of the Waorani Women of the Ecuadorian Amazon, and a high quality chocolate company, WAO Chocolate, to fulfil this purpose, winning a UNDP award in June 2014.

Post 2010, TRAFFIC began to embrace the field of making wildlife trade sustainable through behavioural change. In 2014, TRAFFIC helped launch the Chi Initiative in Vietnam, one of the biggest consumers of rhino horn products, to preserve declining rhino populations.

Achievements

The Bad Ivory Database System (BIDS) and the Elephant Trade Information System (ETIS), 1992 
The Elephant Trade Information system (ETIS) is an information system that tracks illegal trade in ivory and other elephant products. Managed by TRAFFIC on behalf of CITES, it contained nearly 20,000 records from around 100 countries by 2014. ETIS originated from TRAFFIC's BIDS, set up in 1992 to keep track of law enforcement records from ivory seizures or confiscations around the world since 1989.

Drafting EU wildlife regulations, 1997 
In 1992, TRAFFIC published "The wild plant trade in Europe: Results of a survey of European nurseries", a major study on plant trade which recommended harmonising legislation within the EU. TRAFFIC used the study to initiate a project with the WWF the following year to work on improving EU wildlife trade regulations, and the new regulations they drafted took effect in 1997.

UN Resolution on Protecting Wildlife, 2012 
In 2012, TRAFFIC and the WWF launched a joint global campaign encouraging governments to combat illegal wildlife trade and reduce demand for illicit endangered species products. The campaign's momentum led to the unprecedented success of the first UN resolution on wildlife crime in 2015.

Bushmeat, 2000 
TRAFFIC drew attention to the unsustainable use of bushmeat in its 2000 study "Food For Thought: the utilization of wild meat in eastern and southern Africa". Its findings, including the fact that the previously taboo species of zebra was being increasingly harvested, led to widespread publicity including an IUCN report on the subject.

EU-TWIX, 2005 
TRAFFIC, the Belgian Federal Police, Belgian Convention on International Trade in Endangered Species of Wild Fauna and Flora Management Authority (CITES MA), and Belgian Customs set up and maintain a wildlife database and information exchange platform known as the EU Trade in Wildlife Information Exchange (EU-TWIX). Operational by 2005, it centralises data on seizures submitted by EU enforcement agencies, by 2010 holding over 31,000 seizure records and having an active membership of over 500 law enforcement officers from all EU member states.

Recent operations

Current programmes since 2017 
TRAFFIC implemented the USAID funded Wildlife-TRAPS project that operates in Africa and Asia to combat illegal trade between the two continents.

TRAFFIC provided training modules through the ROUTES Partnership.

See also

References

External links
 

Organizations established in 1976
Animal charities based in the United Kingdom
Organisations based in Cambridge
Nature conservation organisations based in the United Kingdom